Francesco Amici (born 5 February 1960) is a Sammarinese sport shooter who specializes in the trap. He has competed at four Olympic games.

At the 2004 Olympic Games he finished in joint ninth place in the trap qualification, missing a place among the top six, who progressed to the final round. Amici also won two medals at World championships (an individual one in 1995 and as a team member in 2010) and two individual medals at World Cup events (in 1995 and 2008).

References

1960 births
Living people
Sammarinese male sport shooters
Shooters at the 1992 Summer Olympics
Shooters at the 1996 Summer Olympics
Shooters at the 2000 Summer Olympics
Shooters at the 2004 Summer Olympics
Olympic shooters of San Marino
Trap and double trap shooters